Theodor Bergk (22 May 181220 July 1881) was a German philologist, an authority on classical Greek poetry.

Biography
He was born in Leipzig as the son of Johann Adam Bergk. After studying at the University of Leipzig, where he profited by the instruction of Gottfried Hermann, he was appointed in 1835 to the lectureship in Latin at the orphan school at Halle. After holding posts at Neustrelitz, Berlin and Cassel, he succeeded (1842) Karl Friedrich Hermann as professor of classical literature at Marburg. In 1852 he went to Freiburg, and in 1857 returned to Halle.

In 1868 he resigned his professorship, and settled down to study and literary work in Bonn. He died on 20 July 1881, at Ragatz in Switzerland, where he had gone for the benefit of his health.

Bergk's literary activity was very great, but his reputation mainly rests upon his work in connection with Greek literature and the Greek lyric poets. His Poetae Lyrici Graeci (1843), and Griechische Litteraturgeschichte (1872–1887) (completed by G. Hinrichs and R. Peppmüller with the aid of Bergk's posthumous papers) became standard works.

He also edited Anacreon (1834), the fragments of Aristophanes (1840), Aristophanes (3rd ed., 1872), Sophocles (2nd ed., 1868), a lyric anthology (4th ed., 1890). Among his other works may be mentioned: Augusti Rerum a se gestarum Index (1873); Inschriften römischer Schleudergeschosse (1876); Zur Geschichte und Topographie der Rheinlande in römischer Zeit (1882); Beiträge zur römischen Chronologie (1884).
His Kleine philologische Schriften were edited by Peppmüller (1884–1886), and contain, in addition to a complete list of his writings, a sketch of his life.

Works 
Aristophanis fragmenta. Edidit Th. Bergk, Berolini typis et impensis G. Reimeri, 1840.
Poetae Lyrici Graeci. Edidit Theodorus Bergk, Lipsiae, Sumtu Reichenbachiorum fratrum, 1843.
Poetae Lyrici Graeci. Recensuit Theodorus Bergk. Editio altera auctior et emendatior. Lipsiae, apud Rechenbachios, 1853.
Poetae Lyrici Graeci. Tertiis curis recensuit Theodorus Bergk. Pars 1, pars 2, pars 3. Lipsiae in aedibus B. G. Teubneri, 1865–67.
Poetae Lyrici Graeci. Recensuit Theodorus Bergk. Editionis quartae. Vol. 2, vol. 3. Lipsiae in aedibus B. G. Teubneri, 1878–82.
Griechische Literaturgeschichte von Theodor Bergk. Vol. 1, vol. 2, vol. 3, vol. 4. Berlin, Weimannsche Buchhanndlung, 1872–87.

Notes

References

1812 births
1881 deaths
German classical scholars
German philologists
Writers from Leipzig
People from the Kingdom of Saxony
Leipzig University alumni
Academic staff of the University of Marburg
Academic staff of the University of Freiburg
Academic staff of the Martin Luther University of Halle-Wittenberg
Members of the Göttingen Academy of Sciences and Humanities